Piano and a Microphone 1983 is a posthumously released demo album by Prince, released on CD, vinyl, and digital formats on September 21, 2018. It is the first album released by the Prince estate consisting solely of material from his archive, the Vault.

Background
The album was discovered as a single cassette tape in Prince's vault at Paisley Park. The music was recorded in one take in 1983 at Prince's Kiowa Trail home studio in Chanhassen, Minnesota. The session is nearly 35 minutes of Prince's vocals while he played piano and segued between songs.

The session includes alternative versions of previously released and yet-to-be released songs, cover versions, and sketches of songs. Four of the album's nine tracks were previously unreleased - "Mary Don't You Weep", "Wednesday" (originally recorded by Jill Jones for a deleted scene in Purple Rain), "Cold Coffee & Cocaine", and "Why The Butterflies".

Critical reception
The New York Times called the album "a glimpse of a notoriously private artist doing his mysterious work" while Adam Mattera in Echoes cited "Mary Don't You Weep" as "a telling choice that points both to his political awareness and gospel heritage - not something people would have expected from a 25 year-old more famous at the time for his flasher mac, high heels and songs about incestuous siblings and used condoms".

Track listing
All songs composed by Prince, except where indicated.

Notes
Track listing adapted from Entertainment Weekly.
Tracks 1 through 7 (which constitute Side A of the vinyl edition) are presented as a continuous medley, as they were originally recorded.
"International Lover" contains an uncredited medley performance of "Do Me, Baby."

Charts

Weekly charts

Year-end charts

References

2018 albums
Demo albums
Albums produced by Prince (musician)
Albums published posthumously
Albums recorded in a home studio
NPG Records albums
Prince (musician) albums
Warner Records albums